The Hardyville Cemetery, also known as the Hardyville Pioneer Cemetery, at 1776 Arizona State Route 95 in Bullhead City, Arizona, is a historic  cemetery that is listed on the National Register of Historic Places.

It is the only surviving significant remnant of Hardyville, a once-thriving shipping port for steamboats (on the Colorado River) and had served as the county seat of Mohave County.  It contains 17 graves, each covered with a pile of cobble stones, as originally created.

It was listed on the National Register in 2001.

References

External links
  (2012)
  (2010)
 
 Hardyville, Patricia Fiscella at Ghosttowns.com

Cemeteries on the National Register of Historic Places in Arizona
Geography of Mohave County, Arizona
Cemeteries in Arizona
National Register of Historic Places in Mohave County, Arizona